Ioan Olteanu (14 December 1839 – 29 November 1877) was a Romanian Greek Catholic hierarch. He was bishop of the Romanian Catholic Eparchy of Lugoj from 1870 to 1873 and the Romanian Catholic Eparchy of Oradea Mare from 1873 to 1877.

Born in Sintești, Timiș, Banat, Austrian Empire (present day – Romania) in 1839, he was ordained a priest on 5 April 1863. He was confirmed the Bishop by the Holy See on 29 November 1870. He was consecrated to the Episcopate on 18 December 1870. The principal consecrator was Bishop Iosif Papp-Szilágyi.

He died in Beiuș (present day – Romania) on 29 November 1877.

References 

1839 births
1877 deaths
19th-century Eastern Catholic bishops
Romanian Greek-Catholic bishops
Recipients of the Order of Franz Joseph